Metapezizella is a genus of fungi in the family Helotiaceae. This is a monotypic genus, containing the single species Metapezizella phyllachorivora.

References

External links
Metapezizella at Index Fungorum

Helotiaceae
Monotypic Ascomycota genera